My Guide to Becoming a Rock Star is an American sitcom television series starring Oliver Hudson. The series premiered March 14, 2002 on The WB. It is based on the British series The Young Person's Guide to Becoming a Rock Star.

Plot
The series focuses on Jace Darnell, the creator and lead singer of his band SlipDog. He, as well as lead guitarist Doc, bassist Joe, keyboardist/DJ Sarah, and drummer Danny–later replaced by drummer Lucas–try to make it in the music business, possibly helped by their reluctant manager Dole.

Critical reception
USA Today published a negative review which stated, "Unfortunately, like so many shows aimed at young people, Rock Star sadly underestimates the intelligence of its audience. Aside from some mildly amusing moments...the show seldom can be bothered to come up with anything even borderline clever." Steve Johnson of the Chicago Tribune criticized the show for poor acting, excessive narration, and a lack of humor.

Cast
 Oliver Hudson as Jace Darnell 
 Lauren Hodges as Joe Delamo  
 Kevin Rankin as Doc Pike 
 Kris Lemche as Lucas Zank 
 Emmanuelle Vaugier as Sarah Nelson 
 Brian Dietzen as Owen

Episodes

References

External links

2000s American musical comedy television series
2000s American single-camera sitcoms
2002 American television series debuts
2002 American television series endings
Television series by Warner Bros. Television Studios
Television shows set in Washington (state)
English-language television shows
American television series based on British television series
The WB original programming